Jøkulhest Dome is the high icecapped summit of Jokulkyrkja Mountain, in the Mühlig-Hofmann Mountains of Queen Maud Land, Antarctica. It was plotted from surveys and air photos by the Sixth Norwegian Antarctic Expedition (1956–60) and named Jøkulhest (the glacier horse).

References

Mountains of Queen Maud Land
Princess Astrid Coast